"Faith" is a song written and performed by George Michael, from his 1987 debut solo album of the same name. It held the number-one position on the Billboard Hot 100 chart for four weeks and, according to Billboard magazine, was the number-one single of the year in the United States in 1988. The song also reached number one in Australia and Canada and number two on the UK Singles Chart. In 2001, it placed at number 322 on the Songs of the Century list.

Writing and recording
As with the rest of the album, the track was written, arranged, and produced by Michael. It is claimed that the idea came from publisher Dick Leahy's suggestion that Michael write a rock and roll pastiche. 
The song began life in May 1987 at PUK Studios, Denmark with Michael doing a 2-bar LinnDrum loop and Hugh Burns playing the Bo Diddley-style acoustic rhythm guitar part on a nameless metal-bodied acoustic.  Long-time bassist Deon Estus laid down a bass part, while the cathedral organ part was recorded with a Yamaha DX7 (although some sources state it is from a Roland D-50). While recording the vocals on the Faith album and other subsequent solo albums, Michael would usually write lyrics in front of the mic, and build the lead vocal by singing a line, each time he had Chris Porter rewind the tape so he could drop in at certain points to create the right emotional effect with his voice. For this song, George wanted the vocals to be "dry and in-your-face", like on Prince's songs at the time, which Porter noted "had a very tight delay on the vocals, making him sound very growly but dry and aggressive" - it was that kind of effect they managed to recreate with an AMS digital delay.

Work on the song later resumed on 1 September 1987, when a new bridge added and a 50s-inspired guitar solo by Burns - played on a Geffen custom Stratocaster - were added at Sarm West Studio 2 in London. According to Porter, the solo was constructed bar-by-bar over a period of 4 hours in a similar fashion to recording George's vocals.

Michael never thought of releasing "Faith" as a single in the beginning but once he decided it was going to be released he extended the song length to add the guitar solo, as explained in an interview with Countdown in 1988:

History
The song incorporates the famed Bo Diddley beat, a classic rock and roll rhythm. It begins with organ played by Chris Cameron, referencing Wham's song "Freedom", followed by guitar strumming, finger clicking, hand-claps, tambourine and hi-hat.

The song was featured in the film Bitter Moon, directed by Roman Polanski. More recently, it featured in Steven Spielberg's Ready Player One and plays during the wedding scene in Ridley Scott's House of Gucci.

Music video
The official music video for the song was directed by Andy Morahan. It features Michael, with noticeable stubble on his face, wearing a black leather jacket with 'Rockers Revenge' and BSA logo, Ray-Ban Aviator sunglasses and a pair of Levi's blue jeans with cowboy boots, playing a guitar near a classic-design Wurlitzer jukebox. Writers Bob Batchelor and Scott Stoddart say the music video positions him as a "masculine sex object", breaking him up into individual body parts such as "stubbled" [sic] chin and butt.

The music video also features part of another song by Michael. The video starts by playing "I Want Your Sex", and then is interrupted by the jukebox starting into "Faith".  The intro of "Faith" is the chorus of Wham!'s song "Freedom", played on a church organ.

Chart performance
The song reached number one on the US Billboard Hot 100 chart and number two on the UK Singles Chart for two weeks in late October and early November 1987. It entered the UK Singles Chart at number 10 but was kept off the top spot by "You Win Again" from the Bee Gees.

On the Billboard Hot 100 chart, "Faith" went from number 54 to number 37, the week of 31 October 1987. It reached number one on 12 December 1987 and remained there for four consecutive weeks. Altogether, "Faith" stayed in the top 10 for nine weeks, the top 20 for 11 weeks and the top 40 for 15 weeks.

Track listing
7": UK / Epic EMU 2
 "Faith" – 3:16
 "Hand To Mouth" – 4:36

12": UK / Epic EMU T2
 "Faith" – 3:16
 "Faith" (Instrumental) – 3:07
 "Hand to Mouth" – 4:36

Mixes
 Album version – 3:16
 Instrumental – 3:07

Personnel
 Vocals, programming, percussion – George Michael
 Bass – Deon Estus
 Guitars – Hugh Burns
 Cathedral organ – Chris Cameron

Charts and certifications

Weekly charts
{| class="wikitable sortable plainrowheaders" style="text-align:center"
|+Weekly chart performance for "Faith"
! scope="col"| Chart (1987–2017)
! scope="col"| Peakposition
|-
!scope="row"|Australia (Australian Music Report)
|1
|-

|-

|-
!scope="row"|Canada (The Record'''s Retail Singles Chart)
|1
|-

|-

|-
!scope="row"|Denmark (IFPI)
|2
|-
!scope="row"|Europe (European Hot 100 Singles)
|1
|-
!scope="row"|Finland (Suomen virallinen lista)
|6
|-

|-

|-

|-
!scope="row"|Iceland (RÚV)
| 7
|-

|-

|-
!scope="row"|Japan (Oricon)
|86
|-

|-

|-

|-

|-

|-
!scope="row"|Spain (PROMUSICAE)
|3
|-

|-

|-

|-

|-

|-

|}

Year-end charts

All-time charts

Certifications and sales

 Limp Bizkit version 

American rap rock group Limp Bizkit covered the song "Faith" in their live performances, using the cover to attract attention to the band. Word of mouth attendance and energetic live performances in which guitarist Wes Borland appeared in bizarre costumes increased the band's cult following. Audiences, in particular, were attracted to Borland's guitar playing and appearance.

Despite the success of the song in Limp Bizkit's live performances, producer Ross Robinson was opposed to recording the cover for their debut album, Three Dollar Bill, Y'all, and tried to persuade the band not to play it on the album. However, the final recording, which incorporated heavier guitar playing and drumming, as well as DJ scratching, impressed Robinson. "I love George Michael and decided to cover 'Faith' for fun. We like to do really aggressive versions of cheesy pop hits," lead singer Fred Durst told Billboard. "I didn't expect him to get busted in that bathroom but his misfortune actually helped us. We couldn't ask for more of a buzz."

Peter Berg directed a music video featuring a bizarre wedding monologue for the song in promotion for its appearance in his film Very Bad Things'', but Fred Durst was unsatisfied with it and directed a second video which paid tribute to tourmates like Primus, Deftones and Mötley Crüe, who appeared in the video. Borland stated in an interview that George Michael, the writer of the song, hated the cover and "hates us for doing it".

References

1987 songs
1987 singles
1998 singles
George Michael songs
Limp Bizkit songs
Billboard Hot 100 number-one singles
Cashbox number-one singles
Columbia Records singles
Dutch Top 40 number-one singles
European Hot 100 Singles number-one singles
Flip Records (1994) singles
Interscope Records singles
MCA Records singles
Music videos directed by Andy Morahan
Music videos directed by Fred Durst
Number-one singles in Australia
Number-one singles in New Zealand
RPM Top Singles number-one singles
Song recordings produced by George Michael
Songs written by George Michael